The canton of Castelsarrasin is an administrative division of the Tarn-et-Garonne department, in southern France. It was created at the French canton reorganisation which came into effect in March 2015. Its seat is in Castelsarrasin.

It consists of the following communes:

Barry-d'Islemade 
Les Barthes
Castelsarrasin
Labastide-du-Temple
Meauzac
La Ville-Dieu-du-Temple

References

Cantons of Tarn-et-Garonne